Abbasabad-e Dasht (also Romanized as ‘Abbāsābād-e Dasht; also known as Dasht) is a village in Sedeh Rural District, Sedeh District, Qaen County, South Khorasan Province, Iran. At the 2006 census, its population was 358, in 107 families.

References 

Populated places in Qaen County